St. Joseph's University Medical Center is a member of St. Joseph's Health. Located in Paterson, New Jersey, St. Joseph's University Medical Center, which includes St. Joseph's Children's Hospital, is a major academic medical center and state designated trauma center that cares for the most complex and routine cases. There is also a second campus located in Paramus, New Jersey on Century Road.
          
The hospital was founded in 1867 and is sponsored by its founders, the Sisters of Charity of Saint Elizabeth.

St. Joseph's University Medical Center is part of St. Joseph's Health, which encompasses St. Joseph's University Medical Center, St. Joseph's Children's Hospital, St. Joseph's Wayne Medical Center, St. Joseph's Healthcare and Rehab Center, and Visiting Health Services of NJ.

See also
Barnert Hospital
List of tallest buildings in Paterson
St. Joseph's Health Website

References

Companies based in Passaic County, New Jersey
Catholic hospitals in North America
Hospitals in New Jersey
Economy of Paterson, New Jersey
Roman Catholic Diocese of Paterson
Trauma centers